Lance Tingay (15 July 1915 – 10 March 1990) was a British sports journalist, historian, and author of several tennis books. For many years his annual ranking of top tennis players was "the only one that counted" before ATP rankings were introduced in 1973.

Career
Tingay began his journalistic career with the Exchange Telegraph news agency. During World War II, he served in the Royal Air Force. Tingay was the tennis correspondent for The Daily Telegraph from 1952 until his retirement in 1981. He wrote several books on tennis, including One Hundred Years of Wimbledon, the official volume marking the centenary of the Wimbledon Championships, and Royalty and Lawn Tennis. As a tennis historian, he compiled the data for the tennis yearbook World of Tennis from 1970 until his death in 1990. During several decades before the introduction of official computerized rankings he published his annual World Rankings of the top 10 players. In 1982, he was inducted into the International Tennis Hall of Fame. In 1985, he self-published an anthology of the works of English novelist Anthony Trollope. He received the Allison Danzig award for distinguished tennis writing in 1968 and was an honorary member of the All England Lawn Tennis and Croquet Club.

Bibliography
 History of Lawn Tennis in Pictures (1973)
 Tennis: A Pictorial History (1977)
 One Hundred Years of Wimbledon (1977)
 Royalty and Lawn Tennis (1977)
 The Guinness Book of Tennis Facts and Feats (1983)
 The Trollope collector : a record of writings by and books about Anthony Trollope (1985)

References

1915 births
1990 deaths
British sports journalists
Tennis writers
International Tennis Hall of Fame inductees
Royal Air Force personnel of World War II